Ashby is an unincorporated community in Cumberland County, Virginia. It sits at an elevation of 433 feet (132 m).

References

Unincorporated communities in Cumberland County, Virginia
Unincorporated communities in Virginia